Mycetocola zhadangensis is a Gram-positive, aerobic and short-rod-shaped bacterium from the genus Mycetocola which has been isolated from snow.

References

External links
Type strain of Mycetocola zhadangensis at BacDive -  the Bacterial Diversity Metadatabase

Microbacteriaceae
Bacteria described in 2013